The 1961–62 European Cup was the fourth edition of Europe's premier club handball tournament.

Knockout stage

Round 1

	

	

|}

Round of 16

	

	

|}

Quarterfinals

	
	

|}

Semifinals

|}

Finals

|}

External links 
 EHF Champions League website
 1962 edition

EHF Champions League seasons
Champions League
Champions League